Maria Katharina Prestel (22 July 1747 – 16 March 1794) née Maria Katharina Höll, was an  engraver and painter from Nuremberg, and active in London.

Biography
Prestel, daughter of Maria and Thomas Höll, was born in Nuremberg where she became a pupil of Johann Gottlieb Prestel. She married Prestel in 1769 but the couple separated in 1786, at which point she moved to London with her daughter Ursula Magdalena Prestel. There she worked for John Boydell making aquatints.
Her painting Gypsies on a Common was included in the 1905 book Women Painters of the World.

Prestel's career in London was quite successful and by the time of her death in 1794, she had produced more than seventy three engraving plates after works by German, Italian, and Dutch artists. She was celebrated for her large aquatint landscape prints, through which she skillfully replicated subtle details of romanticized landscape paintings. Prestel died in Greater London.

Learning engraving and painting techniques from her mother and father, Prestel's daughter, Ursula Magdalena Prestel moved to Brussels to begin her own career as an artist.

References

External links 
 
 Katharina Maria Prestel on artnet

1747 births
1794 deaths
Artists from Nuremberg
18th-century German painters
German women painters
German engravers
18th-century German women artists
Women engravers